Murchadh Ua Beolláin was Archdeacon of Drumcliffe. He died in 1053.

References 

1053 deaths
11th-century Irish priests
Archdeacons of Drumcliffe
Clergy from County Sligo